Franz Potucek (28 May 1927 – 14 November 2001) was an Austrian ice hockey player. He competed in the men's tournament at the 1956 Winter Olympics.

References

1927 births
2001 deaths
Olympic ice hockey players of Austria
Ice hockey players at the 1956 Winter Olympics
Ice hockey people from Vienna